H.M.S. Fable is the third album by Liverpudlian band Shack, released in June 1999 via London Records. It was the band's first album following their reformation after the interest generated by their previous much-delayed album Waterpistol and the album by offshoot band The Strands. H.M.S. Fable was well received by the critics: among the UK music publications, the album was placed at number 2 on both the NME and Uncut critics' poll of the albums of the year for 1999, and number 5 in Select magazine.

Legacy
The album was included in the book 1001 Albums You Must Hear Before You Die.

Track listing

Personnel

Shack
Michael Head – vocals, acoustic guitar
John Head – electric guitar, vocals, Hammond organ on "Cornish Town"
Ren Parry – bass
Iain Templeton – drums, percussion, backing vocals

Additional musicians
Michelle Brown – bass on "Comedy", "Lend's Some Dough" and "Captain's Table"
Martin Duffy – piano on "Lend’s Some Dough"
The Kick Horns (Roddy Lorimer and Paul Spong) – trumpets and horns on "Reinstated" and "Since I Met You"
Richard Payne – Hammond organ on "Reinstated"; celeste on "Since I Met You"
Anne Woods – violin on "Streets of Kenny"

References

Shack (band) albums
1999 albums
Albums produced by Hugh Jones (producer)
Albums produced by Youth (musician)
London Records albums
Albums recorded at Rockfield Studios